The rufous-capped babbler (Cyanoderma ruficeps) is a babbler species in the family Timaliidae. It occurs from the Eastern Himalayas to northern Thailand, Laos, eastern China to Vietnam and Taiwan. It inhabits temperate forest with dense bushes or bamboo and is listed as Least Concern on the IUCN Red List.

Stachyris ruficeps was the scientific name proposed by Edward Blyth in 1847 for an olive-coloured babbler with a ferruginous crown and a white throat collected in Darjeeling.
It was later placed in the genus Stachyridopsis.

References

External links 

rufous-capped babbler
Birds of China
Birds of Eastern Himalaya
Birds of Hainan
Birds of Laos
Birds of Myanmar
Birds of Nepal
Birds of Taiwan
Birds of Vietnam
rufous-capped babbler
rufous-capped babbler
Taxonomy articles created by Polbot